Quiksilver is a brand of surf-inspired apparel and accessories that was founded in 1969 in Torquay, Victoria, but is now based in Huntington Beach, California. It is one of the world's largest brands of surfwear and boardsport-related equipment. The parent company changed its name in March 2017 from Quiksilver, Inc. to Boardriders, Inc., and is the owner of the brands Quiksilver, Roxy and DC Shoes. In 2018, Boardriders acquired Billabong International Limited, gaining the Billabong, Element, Von Zipper, RVCA and XCEL brands.

Quiksilver manufactures and sells a wide range of products that include sportswear (swimsuits), clothing (T-shirts, polo shirts, flannels, jackets, hoodies, pants, shorts), footwear (sneakers, sandals), and accessories (hats, backpacks, and wallets). The company also produces a line of apparel for young women, under the Roxy brand. Another line of apparel for women is sold under the brand Quiksilver Women.

In 2013, Quiksilver initiated a turnaround plan after suffering financial losses for six years. However, by September 2015, the company filed for bankruptcy. After emerging from bankruptcy in early 2016, the company once again became privately held, with Oaktree Capital Management as the majority shareholder.

Recent corporate history
Quiksilver purchased Skis Rossignol for $560 million in 2005, but sold Rossignol on 12 November 2008 for $37.5 million (30 million euros) in cash and a $12.5 million note (10 million euro). Quiksilver owned golf-equipment maker Cleveland Golf until 31 October 2007, when it sold the company to a Japanese sporting-goods company.

In 2009, Moody's included Quiksilver on its Bottom Rung list of companies most likely to default on its debt.

As of 2013, Quiksilver operated 834 stand-alone stores in major cities across Australia, New Zealand, and the Pacific, Europe, North and South America, Asia, and Africa]. At that time, the two types of Quiksilver-operated stores were known as either "Boardriders Club" or "Factory" stores. Their products were also sold in many other outlets across the world, such as PacSun, the Fells Point Surf Company, and the Ron Jon Surf Shop. With PacSun's decline in retail prominence, Quiksilver and other brands suffered diminished sales. In addition, the company operated a number of separate Roxy and Quiksilver Youth stores.

As of 2013, the company suffered a financial slump for six years and initiated a turnaround plan in an attempt to resolve this. In September 2015, the company filed for Chapter 11 bankruptcy.

Co-founder of Quiksilver Bob McKnight stepped down as CEO on 11 January 2013. He then acted as executive chairman, until retiring in October 2014. Andy Mooney, who was formerly chairman of Disney Consumer Products, served as CEO from 2013 to 2015.

Mooney stepped down as the CEO of Quiksilver and was replaced in March 2015 by longtime Quiksilver employee Pierre Agnes to restructure the brand. In 2015, Pierre Agnes was promoted from president to CEO.

Quiksilver emerged from bankruptcy in early 2016, and the company once again became privately held, with Oaktree Capital Management as the majority shareholder. By the end of 2016, their retail presence had significantly diminished after restructuring by Oaktree.

The company's name was changed in March 2017 to Boardriders, Inc., and it is the owner of the Quiksilver, Roxy, and DC Shoes brands. Boardriders purchased Billabong International Limited in 2018.

On 30 January 2018, the global CEO of Boardriders, Pierre Agnes, was declared missing after his powerboat washed ashore without him near Biarritz, France, after he radioed in to delay his return in thick fog conditions. A search operation by air and sea was launched the same day. The search was called off a few days later, as he was declared lost at sea and presumed dead. Dave Tanner, the company's former chief turnaround officer, became CEO on 6 February 2018.

Boardriders, Inc. currently owns these brands: Quiksilver, Roxy, DC Shoes, Billabong, Element, Von Zipper, RVCA, and XCEL.

Roxy
In 1990, Quiksilver launched its sister brand for young women, Roxy. The brand was shuttered after the 1991 surf industry crash, but revived by Bob McKnight and Danny Kwock in 1992, signing Lisa Andersen in 1993. It was differentiated from the main Quiksilver line "for fear it would damage the men's brand", according to Randy Hild, the company's senior vice president of marketing. Roxy was chosen because it sounded like a punk band or club (likely Roxy Music and The Roxy respectively), and is also the name of the daughters of both CEO Bob McKnight and founder Alan Green. About 30% of Quiksilver's sales come from the Roxy line.

Since inception, Roxy has grown to be the largest action sport fashion apparel company for young women. In addition to apparel, it now also produces accessories, homewares, hard goods (snow and surf), wetsuits, footwear, and books. It has sub-brands for its children's ranges, Roxy Girl and Teenie Wahine.

In the spring of 2013, the "DVF loves Roxy" collection was released as a one-time limited-edition collaboration line of swim and beach wear as well as accessories.

Brand image 
The Quiksilver brand's logo, designed in 1973 by founders Alan Green and John Law, was inspired by Japanese painter Hokusai's woodcut, The Great Wave off Kanagawa. It depicts a large wave with a mountain on a red background. Roxy's heart-shaped logo was created by duplicating and reflecting the Quiksilver logo and rotating both copies at a 45-degree angle.

See also

 Quiksilver Pro Gold Coast
 Quiksilver Pro France
 Quiksilver Big Wave Invitational

References

External links

 
 Boardriders (parent corporation)
 Official website (Roxy)

Clothing brands of Australia
Surfwear brands
Swimwear manufacturers
Skateboarding companies
Sporting goods manufacturers of Australia
Snowboarding companies
Manufacturing companies based in Greater Los Angeles
Retail companies based in California
Companies based in Huntington Beach, California
Clothing companies established in 1969
Retail companies established in 1969
1969 establishments in Australia
1990s fashion
2000s fashion
2010s fashion
Companies formerly listed on the New York Stock Exchange
Companies that filed for Chapter 11 bankruptcy in 2015
Australian subsidiaries of foreign companies